The Union of Brewery and Mill Workers and Kindred Trades was a trade union representing workers in the food and drink processing industry in Germany.

The union was founded on 1 October 1910, when the Central Union of Brewery Workers merged with the German Mill Workers' Union.  The brewers dominated the new union, which adopted its constitution and structure.  Like its predecessors, the union affiliated to the General Commission of German Trade Unions, and it was also a leading member of the International Secretariat of Brewery Workers.  In 1919, the union was a founding affiliate of the General German Trade Union Confederation.

In 1922, the union renamed itself as the Union of Food and Beverage Workers.  By 1927, the union had 74,443 members.  On 24 September, it merged with the Central Union of Bakers and Confectioners, the Central Union of Butchers, and the Union of Coopers, Cellar Managers, and Helpers in Germany, to form the Union of Food and Drink Workers.

Presidents
1910: Martin Etzel
1914: Eduard Backert

References

Food processing trade unions
Trade unions in Germany
Trade unions established in 1910
Trade unions disestablished in 1927